Hande Erçel (born 24 November 1993) is a Turkish actress, best known for her roles in Güneşin Kızları, Aşk Laftan Anlamaz, Halka and Sen Çal Kapımı.

Career 
Hande Erçel starred in the series Aşk Laftan Anlamaz (2016–2017) as Hayat Uzun, opposite Burak Deniz. The show gained her and Deniz wide popularity in India, Pakistan and Uzbekistán especially in Middle East. She also played the role of Hazal in Siyah İnci on Star TV. She then landed the role of Müjde in Halka on TRT 1. Her performances include the role of Azize Günay in Azize, broadcast on Kanal D, opposite Buğra Gülsoy. In 2020, Erçel was cast in a leading role in Sen Çal Kapımı together with Kerem Bürsin, which opened with high ratings in Turkey. It was also sold to more than 100 countries, with Spain becoming the first country in the world besides Turkey to air the series.

Filmography

Film

Television

Music video

Awards

References

External links 
 
 

Living people
Turkish television actresses
Turkish female models
1993 births
People from Balıkesir